The William A. Egan Civic and Convention Center (commonly known as simply the Egan Center) is a  convention center located in downtown Anchorage, Alaska at 555 West Fifth Avenue.  Constructed in 1984 as part of a massive Anchorage-wide public works project dubbed "Project 80s", it replaced the original Z. J. Loussac Library, which opened on the same site in 1955 and was demolished in 1981.  The library moved to a new building in midtown Anchorage, also as part of Project 80s.  The building is named for Alaska's first governor, William Allen Egan.  It features a unique glass front that runs the entire length of the facility providing the reception area and the giant Ficus retusa trees inside with plenty of natural light.  A skywalk across Fifth Avenue connects the building to the Alaska Center for the Performing Arts.

The building was designed by CCC Architects and Planners of Anchorage.

External links
 Egan Center Homepage
 Anchorage Convention & Visitors Bureau
 Anchorage Civic & Convention District

References

1984 establishments in Alaska
Buildings and structures completed in 1984
Buildings and structures in Anchorage, Alaska
Economy of Anchorage, Alaska
Music venues in Alaska
Tourist attractions in Anchorage, Alaska